The 2007 Moldovan Super Cup was the fourth Moldovan Super Cup, an annual Moldovan football match played by the winner of the national football league (the National Division) and the winner of the national Cup. The match was played between Sheriff Tiraspol, champions of the 2006–07 National Division, and Zimbru Chișinău, winners of the 2006–07 Moldovan Cup. It was held at the Sheriff Stadium on 27 June 2007.

Sheriff Tiraspol won the match 1–0.

Match

References

2007–08 in Moldovan football
FC Zimbru Chișinău matches
FC Sheriff Tiraspol matches
Moldovan Super Cup